James Roland Walter Parker CMG OBE (20 December 1919 – 17 November 2009) was the Governor of the Falkland Islands and High Commissioner for the British Antarctic Territory from 1976 to 1980.

Life
He was the son of Alexander Roland Parker of the Incorporated Society of Musicians, and in 1938 went to work at the Ministry of Labour. He served at the beginning of World War II in the 1st London Scottish, from March to October 1940. During that time he lost the lower part of his left leg.

At the beginning of the Nigerian Civil War, in 1967, Parker was in Enugu as deputy to the British High Commissioner David Hunt. On good terms with C. Odumegwu Ojukwu, he evaluated the situation quite differently from Hunt, who placed the blame for the outbreak of hostilities on Ojukwu's ambition. In August of that year, Akanu Ibiam renounced his British knighthood in a letter to Parker.

References 

1919 births
2009 deaths
Governors of the Falkland Islands
Place of birth missing
Members of the Order of the British Empire
Companions of the Order of St Michael and St George
Commissioners of the British Antarctic Territory
British Army personnel of World War II
Gordon Highlanders soldiers